is a former Japanese football player.

Playing career
Fujita was born in Saitama Prefecture on July 23, 1979. After graduating from Juntendo University, he joined the J2 League club Montedio Yamagata in 2002. On March 3, he debuted against Cerezo Osaka in the opening game of the 2002 season. He played many matches as midfielder in 2002. However he did not play any games in 2003 and left Cerezo at the end of the 2003 season.

Club statistics

References

External links

1979 births
Living people
Juntendo University alumni
Association football people from Saitama Prefecture
Japanese footballers
J2 League players
Montedio Yamagata players
Blaublitz Akita players
Association football midfielders